The 2019 NFL Draft was the 84th annual meeting of National Football League (NFL) franchises to select newly eligible players for the 2019 NFL season. The draft was held on April 25–27 in Nashville, Tennessee. The first round was held on April 25, followed by the second and third rounds on April 26, and concluded with rounds 4–7 on April 27. The draft featured a record-high 40 trades, surpassing the 37 that were made in 2017.

Early entrants

A record-high 111 eligible applicants announced their intention to enter the 2019 NFL Draft as underclassmen, which primarily included juniors and redshirt sophomores who forwent future years of college eligibility. In order to be eligible to enter the draft, players must be at least three years removed from high school. The deadline for underclassmen to declare for the draft was January 14, 2019.

Host city bid process
The host city for the 2019 (as well as the 2020) draft was chosen from among finalists Denver, Kansas City, Las Vegas, Nashville and Cleveland/Canton in May 2018 at the NFL Spring League Meeting. On May 23, 2018, the league announced Nashville as the host city of the 2019 NFL Draft.

Player selections

The following is the breakdown of the 254 players selected by position:

 32 Cornerbacks
 31 Linebackers
 28 Wide receivers
 26 Defensive ends
 25 Running backs
 23 Offensive tackles
 21 Defensive tackles
 19 Safeties
 16 Tight ends
 12 Offensive guards
 11 Quarterbacks
 5 Centers
 2 Placekickers
 2 Punters
 1 Long snapper

Notable undrafted players

Supplemental draft 
A supplemental draft was held on July 10, 2019. For each player selected in the supplemental draft, the team forfeits its pick in that round in the draft of the following season.

Trades

In the explanations below, (PD) indicates trades completed prior to the start of the draft (i.e. Pre-Draft), while (D) denotes trades that took place during the 2019 draft.

Round one

Round two

Round three

Round four

Round five

Round six

Round seven

Forfeited picks

Media coverage
In November 2018, after having aired the final rounds of the draft on the network, ESPN announced that it would air coverage of all three days of the 2019 draft on ABC, using an entertainment-oriented format and hosted by the panel of College GameDay (which hosted an alternate ESPN2 broadcast of the previous draft), including Lee Corso, Rece Davis, Kirk Herbstreit and Desmond Howard. It marked the first time that broadcast television coverage of all three days of the NFL Draft had been carried by a single network; in 2018, the first two nights aired on Fox in association and simulcast with NFL Network. ESPN and NFL Network continued to broadcast more traditionally-formatted coverage. In addition, NFL Network's morning show Good Morning Football was simulcast on ESPN2 on both April 25 and 26, while ESPN and NFL Network personalities made appearances across the networks' studio programs.

The NFL reported an average viewership of 6.1 million across all ESPN and NFL outlets carrying coverage, up from the composite average of 5.5 million in 2018, and estimated that at least 47.5 million viewers watched coverage at some point during the draft. The NFL also reported that at least 600,000 people attended events associated with the draft, overtaking 2017 as the most-attended NFL Draft.

Summary

Selections by NCAA conference

A then-record 64 players were drafted from one conference, the second-most in NFL history, breaking the previous high of 63 selections in 2013. Both numbers were set by the Southeastern Conference. The record was broken in 2021, when 65 players were selected also from the SEC.

Schools with multiple draft selections

Of note, Allen High School boasted three selections in the 2019 NFL draft, by drafting Kyler Murray, Greg Little, and Bobby Evans.

Selections by position

Notes

References
Trade references

General references

National Football League Draft
Draft
NFL Draft
21st century in Nashville, Tennessee
American football in Tennessee
NFL Draft
Events in Nashville, Tennessee
Sports in Nashville, Tennessee